Helen Eva Grenga (1938 - April 14, 2006) was the first full-tenured female engineering professor at the Georgia Institute of Technology. One of the first tenure women chemical engineering professors in the USA.

Early life and education
Grenga graduated from Shorter College in 1960 with a B.A. in Chemistry, and from the University of Virginia in 1967 with a Ph.D. in Physical Chemistry.

She worked for the Food and Drug Administration for a few years before returning to academia.

Georgia Tech
Grenga first arrived at Georgia Tech in 1967, working as a postdoctoral fellow in chemistry. In 1968, she held the title of professor of metallurgy.

Other roles Grenga held included Director of the Office of Graduate Studies and Research, and Dean of the Office of Academic Affairs.

Awards 
Grenga received a number of awards, including the Georgia Tech ANAK Faculty Award and the Georgia Tech Women’s Leadership Conference’s Women of Distinction Outstanding Faculty Member Award.

From 1981 to 1982, she was national president of the Society of Women Engineers, having joined the organisation in 1973. She worked to support other women into STEM fields, and suporeted the local SWE branch at Georgia Tech.

In 2001, Grenga published Movies on the Fantail, about her brother's time on the USS Barr during World War II.

Helen Grenga died on 14 April 2006 aged 68.

Legacies 
Helen Grenga Outstanding Woman Engineer Award

Publications 
Active sites for the catalytic decomposition of carbon monoxide on nickel (1967) 

Structure and Topography of Monocrystalline Nickel Thin Films Grown by Vapor Deposition (1971)

Active Sites for Heterogeneous Catalysis (1972)

Field-ion microscopy of ferrous martensite (1972)

Chemisorption and catalysis : carbon monoxide on metals and alloys (1972) 

Adsorption of carbon monoxide on ruthenium (1973)

Field-ion microscope investigations of fine structures in as-quenched and tempered ferrous martensite (1973)

Field-ion microscopy of tempered martensite (1974)

Auger analysis of surface films on Ag3Sn. (1975)

Surface energy anisotropy of iridium (1975)

Twenty-second International Field Emission Symposium (1975)

Surface energy anisotropy of tungsten (1976)

Surface energy anisotropy of iron (1976)

Chemisorption and analysis : carbon monoxide on metals and alloys (1980)

Cooperative education comprehensive demonstration program for post secondary students (1987)

References

1938 births
2006 deaths
Georgia Tech faculty
Shorter University alumni
University of Virginia alumni
Engineers from Georgia (U.S. state)
American women engineers
20th-century American engineers
20th-century women engineers
20th-century American women
American women academics
21st-century American women